Brian Ratigan (born December 27, 1970) is a former American football linebacker. He played for the Indianapolis Colts in 1994.

References

1970 births
Living people
American football linebackers
Notre Dame Fighting Irish football players
Indianapolis Colts players